David Freeman may refer to:

David Freeman (athlete) (born 1982), Puerto Rican middle-distance runner
David Freeman (business owner) (born 1984), Australian business owner
David Freeman (footballer) (born 1979), Irish footballer
David Freeman (journalist) (born 1959), American journalist
David Freeman (music historian) (born 1939), collector, historian, and authority on old-time and bluegrass music
David Freeman (musician) (born 1957), member of The Flys and The Lover Speaks
David Freeman (screenwriter) (born 1926), American screenwriter
David Freeman (solicitor) (1928–2015), British solicitor
David Freeman-Mitford, 2nd Baron Redesdale (1878–1958), English landowner and father of the Mitford sisters
David Guthrie Freeman (1920–2001), American badminton and tennis player
David Justin Freeman (born 1984), Christian minister, private educator and conservative political activist
S. David Freeman (1926–2020), American engineer, attorney, and author 
Dave Freeman (American author) (1961–2008), American advertising executive and co-author of 100 Things to Do Before You Die
Dave Freeman (British writer) (1922–2005), British comedy writer

Fictional characters 
David Scott Freeman, main character in 1986 film Flight of the Navigator

See also 
David Freedman (disambiguation)